The Émile Picard Medal (or Médaille Émile Picard) is a medal named for Émile Picard awarded every 6 years to an outstanding mathematician by the Institut de France, Académie des sciences. This rewards a mathematician designated by the Academy of Sciences every six years. The first medal was awarded in 1946.

Recipients 
The Émile Picard Medal recipients are 

 Maurice Fréchet (1946)
 Paul Lévy (1953)
 Henri Cartan (1959)
 Szolem Mandelbrojt (1965),
 Jean-Pierre Serre (1971)
 Alexandre Grothendieck (1977)
 André Néron (1983)
 François Bruhat (1989)
 Jean-Pierre Kahane (1995)
 Jacques Dixmier (2001)
 Louis Boutet de Monvel (2007)
 Luc Illusie (2012)
 Yves Colin de Verdière (2018)

See also

 List of mathematics awards

References

French science and technology awards
Mathematics awards